Micrurus spurrelli, the butterfly-head coral snake, is a species of coral snake in the family Elapidae. Specimens have been identified mostly in Chocó Department.

References 

spurreli
Snakes of South America
Reptiles of Colombia
Reptiles described in 1914